Tonico e Tinoco were a Brazilian música sertaneja duo from the state of São Paulo, composed of brothers Tonico (João Salvador Perez, March 2, 1917 – 1994) and Tinoco (José Perez, November 19, 1920 – May 4, 2012), they are regarded among the most famous and prolific artists in sertanejo. With their first hit single, "Chico Mineiro" (1946), they were named "A Dupla Coração do Brasil" ("The Brazilian Heart Duo"). They performed more than 40,000 times between 1935 and 1994, recorded more than 1,000 songs and sold over 150 million albums despite never performing outside of Brazil.

History

Early life and musical beginnings

Born in rural São Paulo to Spanish father Salvador Pérez and Brazilian mother Maria do Carmo, João and José Perez's passion for music came from their maternal grandparents Olegario and Isabel, who played songs on an old accordion. The brothers quickly began to learn and play songs and had their first concert on August 15, 1935.  Along with their cousin Miguel, the brothers performed as Trio da Roca.  The trio became known locally via radio broadcasts.

In 1937 the Pérez family relocated the city of Sorocaba, São Paulo. Tonico took up work in a quarry and cement factory while Tinoco turned to shining shoes and highway construction during Brazil's economic crisis and the onset of World War II.  With city life proving unbearable, the family returned to farming in the countryside.  By now the Perez brothers were performing as a duo, and their return to their rural home afforded them opportunity to perform live on the radio while they continued to travel to the city on Sundays to pick up extra work.  Traveling back and forth between São Paulo's urban and rural areas helped the brothers to spread their music around the state, performing on the street, at festivals, entering contests and making appearances on many radio stations.

The duo made their recording debut on the Continental label in 1945 with the song "Em Vez de Me Agradecê" ("Instead of Thanking Me") the cateretê ".  During the recording session, the brothers sang so loudly (as they did on the farm) that they overloaded and broke the microphone. The following year the duo broke through with the single "Chico Mineiro" making Tonico e Tinoco the most famous sertaneja duo in Brazil and making it possible for the brothers to buy a home for their family.

Later success

In 1961 Tonico and Tinoco made their cinematic debut in Eduardo Llorente film Lá no Meu Sertão, based on the life and work of the duo.  While the film was in production, Tonico nearly died from tuberculosis and his brother Chiquinho filled in for him for both radio and studio appearances.  Despite fears that Tonico would not be able to sing after surgery, the duo were soon performing again at full caliber.

In 1965 Eduardo Llorente featured the duo in another film, Obrigado à Matar, based on the legend of Chico Mineiro and the song of the same name that had made Tonico e Tinoco famous. Another film followed in 1969—A Marca da Ferradura (The Mark of the Horseshoe) by Nelson Teixeira Mendes and the following year the duo recorded a tribute album to Raul Torres which was completed two months after the singer died.  Two less successful films—Llorente's Os Três Justiceiros (The Three Gunslingers) and Osvaldo de Oliveira's Luar do Sertão had the Perez brothers give up their acting career and focus solely on music.

On June 6, 1979, Tonico & Tinoco gave a three-hour concert for 2,500 people at the Municipal Theatre of São Paulo, a venue that had previously been used only for operas and ballets. In 1984, they returned to the screen as a cameo in Andrew Klotzel's A Marvada Carne.

Deaths
Tonico & Tinoco's final concert was in Mato Grosso on August 7, 1994. Tonico died shortly thereafter. Tinoco continued to perform solo until his death on May 4, 2012, in São Paulo, due to complications after respiratory failure. He was 91 years old.

Discography

Albums
1958: Suas Modas Sertanejas
1959: Na Beira da Tuia
1960: A Dupla Coração do Brasil
1961: A Saudade Vai
1962: La no Meu Sertão
1963: Cantando para o Brasil
1965: Data Feliz
1966: Artista de Circo
1966: Rancho de Palha
1969: Rei dos Pampas
1971: A Marca da Ferradura
1971: Laço de Amizade

Compilations
1968: As 12 Mais de Tonico e Tinoco
1983: Os Grandes Sucessos de Tonico e Tinoco

Singles

 Chico Mineiro                
 Azul Cor de Anil
 Rei do Volante
 Minas Gerais
 Boiadeiro Punho de Aço
 João de Barro
 Oi Vida Minha! (Moda do Peão)
 O Menino da Porteira
 Saudade que eu Tenho
 Boi Amarelinho
 As Flores
 Boa Noite Amor
 Mandamento do Motorista
 Pingo Preto
 Porquê
 Paineira Velha
 Lembranças
 Cavalo Branco
 Retalhos de Amor
 A Viagem do Tietê
 Lenda da Valsa dos Noivos
 Três Batidas na Porteira
 Praia Serena
 Motorista do Progresso
 Sorte Tirana
 Distante de Ti
 Adeus Gaúcha
 Filho de Mato Grosso
 Último Adeus
 Carreiro Sebastião
 Ranchinho de Taquara
 Saudades de Araraquara
 Teu Nome Tem Sete Letras
 Bombardeio
 Duas Cartas
 Fandango Mineiro
 Gaúcho Velho
 Fogo na Serra
 Decisão Cruel
 Encantos da Natureza
 Chão de Goiás
 Eu Penso em Ti
 Minha Mágoa
 Burro Picaço
 Chitãozinho e Xororó
 Piracicaba
 Cabocla Tereza
 Bom Jesus de Pirapora
 Canção da Criança
 Não Vou Brincar
 Estrela do Oriente
 Dia de Natal
 A Cuíca tá Roncando
 Anel de Noivado
 A Viola e o Cantador
 Cidade Grande
 Juriti Mineira
 Viola de Ouro
 Bate co Pé, Bate cá Mão
 La Paloma
 Velho Candieiro
 Arroz à Carreteiro
 Filho Pródigo
 Disparada
 Pinga Ni Mim
 No Meu Pé de Serra
 O Sanfoneiro só Tocava Isso
 Seresta
 Êh! São Paulo
 Felicidade
 A Mão do Tempo

References

Sertanejo music groups
Sertanejo musicians
Musical groups established in 1946
Musical groups disestablished in 1994
1946 establishments in Brazil
1994 disestablishments in Brazil
Musical groups from São Paulo (state)
Brazilian musical duos